Events from the year 2004 in Taiwan, Republic of China. This year is numbered Minguo 93 according to the official Republic of China calendar.

Incumbents
 President – Chen Shui-bian
 Vice President – Annette Lu
 Premier – Yu Shyi-kun
 Vice Premier – Lin Hsin-i, Yeh Chu-lan

Events

February
 1 February – The upgrade of Van Nung Institute of Technology in Zhongli City, Taoyuan County to Vanung University.
 28 February – 228 Hand-in-Hand Rally.

March
 9 March – The opening of Chiayi Municipal Museum in East District, Chiayi City.
 10 March – The establishment of National Airborne Service Corps of the Ministry of the Interior.
 19 March – 3-19 shooting incident, an assassination attempt on Chen Shui-bian and Annette Lu in Tainan City. 
 20 March
 2004 Republic of China presidential election took place and Chen Shui-bian won the election, compiling 50.11% of the popular vote.
 2004 Republic of China referendum.
 21 March – The opening of Changhua City Library in Changhua County.

April
 1 April
 The merging between West District and Central District to form the West Central District in Tainan City.
 The opening of Chuwan Crab Museum in Xiyu Township, Penghu County.

May
 1 May – The opening of Green World Ecological Farm in Beipu Township, Hsinchu County.
 8 May – 15th Golden Melody Awards in Taipei City.
 20 May – The swearing in of the second term of President Chen Shui-bian.

June
 1 June
 The establishment of CTV MyLife.
 The establishment of TTV Family.

July
 1 July
 The establishment of Bureau of Energy.
 The establishment of CTV News Channel.
 The establishment of Financial Supervisory Commission.
 The establishment of PTS2.
 4 July – The establishment of the Formosa Party.

August
 1 August – The establishment of Kao Fong College in Changzhi Township, Pingtung County.
 7 August – The opening of Puppetry Art Center of Taipei in Songshan District, Taipei.
 13 August – The founding of Runewaker Entertainment in Taichung.
 17–27 August – Typhoon Aere.

September
 1 September – The establishment of TTV Finance.
 29 September – The opening of Xiaobitan Branch Line of Taipei Metro.

October
 1–3 October – The 1st Taiwan Youth Day.

November
 19 November – The opening of Miramar Entertainment Park in Zhongshan District, Taipei.
 21 November – The start of 2004 FIFA Futsal World Championship.
 21–27 November – Taiwan hosted the 2004 FIBA Asia Stanković Cup. Qatar national basketball team won the competition.

December
 1 December – The renaming of Keelung City Cultural Center to Keelung Cultural Center.
 11 December
 2004 Democratic Progressive Party presidential primary
 2004 Republic of China legislative election was held and Chen Shui-bian won the popular vote of the election.
 18 December – 11,551 residents of Kaohsiung City set a world record: longest time to play two songs without stopping.
 28 December – The opening of YM Oceanic Culture and Art Museum in Ren'ai District, Keelung.

Deaths
 3 March – Wei Yung, 67, Minister of Research, Development and Evaluation Commission (1976-1988).
6 April – , suicide by hanging. 
 14 August – , 23, Taiwanese model, suicide by jumping.
 15 December – Chiang Fang-liang, 88, First Lady (1978–1988), lung cancer.

References

External links

Year 2004 Calendar - Taiwan
Taiwan, 2004 Timeline
Year 2004 Legislative Yuan Elections in Taiwan

 
Years of the 21st century in Taiwan
Republic of China